Douglas Brent West is a professor of graph theory at University of Illinois at Urbana-Champaign. He received his Ph.D. from Massachusetts Institute of Technology in 1978; his advisor was Daniel Kleitman. He is the "W" in G. W. Peck, a pseudonym for a group of six mathematicians that includes West. He is the editor of the journal Discrete Mathematics.

Selected work

Books
 Introduction to Graph Theory - Second edition, Douglas B. West. Published by Prentice Hall 1996, 2001. 
 Mathematical Thinking: Problem-Solving and Proofs Second edition, John P D'Angelo and Douglas West.  Published by Prentice Hall 1999.

Research work
 Spanning trees with many leaves, DJ Kleitman, DB West - SIAM Journal on Discrete Mathematics, 1991.
 Class of Solutions to the Gossip Problem, Part II, DB West - Discrete Mathematics, 1982.
 The interval number of a planar graph: three intervals suffice, ER Scheinerman, DB West - Journal of combinatorial theory. Series B, 1983.

See also
Erdős–Gallai theorem
Necklace splitting problem

References

External links
 West's home page at UIUC

Graph theorists
Living people
Massachusetts Institute of Technology School of Science alumni
University of Illinois Urbana-Champaign faculty
1953 births
20th-century American mathematicians
21st-century American mathematicians